(lit. The Never-setting Sun) is a 2009 Japanese film directed by Setsurō Wakamatsu. It is also known as The Unbroken in the United States.

Shizumanu Taiyō is based on a novel by Toyoko Yamasaki which centers on Hajime Onchi, an employee of "NAL," a large national airline. The first part of the novel focuses on Onchi's activity as the chairman of the employees' union in the 1960s; his reward for fighting for better working conditions for the staff is a series of postings abroad, to Pakistan, Iran, and finally Kenya, a destination to which the company does not even fly. The second and third parts of the novel take place in 1985 and chronicle the crash of a jumbo jet and its aftermath within the company.

The events portrayed in the story are based upon actual events that took place at Japan Airlines. The character of Onchi is based upon JAL labor organizer and author Hirotaro Ogura, and the pivotal crash portrayed in the novel is based closely upon the crash of Japan Airlines Flight 123 (up to having the same flight number and taking place at the same location, date and time). Several politicians and JAL executives portrayed in the story are also based on real-world counterparts. JAL objected strongly to both the novel and the film, stating that they were defamatory to the airline and disrespected the victims of the actual Flight 123. The novel claims to be a work based upon real-life events, while the film claims to be entirely a work of fiction.

The cast of the film includes Ken Watanabe as Onchi, with Kōji Ishizaka, Kyōko Suzuki, Yasuko Matsuyuki and Tomokazu Miura in supporting roles. The violininst Diana Yukawa, whose father died in the real-world crash of JAL Flight 123, was involved in the music for the film.

The premiere was on 24 October 2009 in Ginza. Yukawa performed "Little Prayer", the track she recorded for the film.

Awards and nominations
34th Hochi Film Award
 Won: Best Film
 Won: Best Actor - Ken Watanabe
33rd Japan Academy Prize
 Won: Best Film
 Won: Best Actor - Ken Watanabe

Cast
 Ken Watanabe as Hajime Onchi
 Tomokazu Miura as Shiro Gyoten
 Teruyuki Kagawa as Kazuo Yagi
 Kyōka Suzuki as Ritsuko Onchi
 Erika Toda as Junko Onchi
 Go Kato as the prime minister Yasushi Tonegawa (based on Yasuhiro Nakasone)
 Nenji Kobayashi as the deputy prime minister Takemaru (based on Shin Kanemaru)
 Tōru Shinagawa as Issei Ryuzaki (based on Ryūzō Sejima)
 Kōji Ishizaka as Masayuki Kunimi
 Tae Kimura as Natsuko Suzuki
 Yasuko Matsuyuki as Miki Mitsui

References

External links
 

2009 films
2000s Japanese-language films
Films directed by Setsurō Wakamatsu
Japanese aviation films
Picture of the Year Japan Academy Prize winners
Japanese films based on actual events
Toho films
2000s Japanese films